The Football Association of Singapore Premier League was a semi-professional football league competition held in Singapore between 1988 and 1995. The Premier League succeeded the National Football League Division One as the top tier of the Singapore football league structure. It was replaced by the S.League in 1996.

The Football Association of Singapore (FAS) entered a representative team in the Malaysian League and Malaysia Cup competitions up to 1994. The Singapore team's participation in these competitions was the main focus of most Singapore football fans at the time, and the local league was generally considered to be a fairly minor competition. The Singapore league season was usually held fairly early the year, and many of the Singapore players in the Malaysian competitions also played for clubs in the local Singapore league.

Eight clubs - Hwee Seng SC, Jurong Town FC, Changi CSC, Armed Forces, Tampines Rovers, Tiong Bahru CSC, Balestier United RC and Geylang International - were selected to contest the inaugural season in 1988. The dominant team in the FAS Premier League was Geylang International, which won the league six consecutive times from 1988-1993.

In 1994, in a bid to add some spice to the Premier League and generate increased fan interest, two teams from Australia were invited to participate – the Perth Kangaroos and the Darwin Cubs. However, after confirming the participation of the two Australian clubs, the FAS then decided to withdraw all the players in its Malaysian League team from participating in the local league that year. This considerably weakened the strength of the local clubs. Perth Kangaroos won the Premier League that year without losing a game, and the Darwin Cubs finished second. The experiment did not succeed in bolstering fan interest.

In 1995, the FAS unexpectedly decided to withdraw the Singapore team from the Malaysian League. Most of the players on the Singapore national football team had been due to play in the Malaysian League team. It was therefore decided that the national team should play in the 1995 Premier League competition as a stop-gap measure until the establishment of the S.League the following year. Not surprisingly, the national team finished the season undefeated against the club sides and comfortably won the Premier League that year.

The Premier League was disbanded with the formation of the professional S.League in 1996.

Premier League champions

See also
 Singapore National Football League
 Singapore Premier League

References

Defunct football competitions in Singapore
Football in Singapore
Football leagues in Singapore